Shuleh or Shooleh may refer to:
 Shuleh, Chaharmahal and Bakhtiari
 Shuleh, Gilan